The Supreme Court of Sweden (abbreviated HD)  is the supreme court and the third and final instance in all civil and criminal cases in Sweden. Before a case can be decided by the Supreme Court, leave to appeal must be obtained, and with few exceptions, leave to appeal can be granted only when the case is of interest as a precedent. The Supreme Court consists of 16 Justices who are appointed by the government, but the court as an institution is independent of the Riksdag, and the Government is not able to interfere with the decisions of the court.

History
Historically, all judicial power was vested in the Monarch, but in 1614 Gustavus Adolphus instituted Svea Court of Appeal and authorized it to issue sentences in his name. Those not satisfied with sentencing were able to turn directly to the monarch, and appeals were handled by the Justice Department of the Privy Council (in ), a committee of that council.

Under the rule of King Gustav III, the noble Privy Council was suspended in 1789 after the Riksdag of the estates introduced an addition to the instrument of government from 1772 called the Union and Security Act. After the Riksdag ended, the King on 19 May instituted the King's Supreme Court to handle legal matters. There were twelve judges of the court, half of which was to be nobles and half commoners. While in session, no more than eight judges could serve at the same time, and with equal numbers of nobles and commoners. In the court, the king held two votes, as well as the deciding vote in case of a tie. However, this voting right was never exercised, except on the centennial of the court, when King Oscar II took part in the decision of one case.

Under the 1809 Instrument of Government, the judges of the Supreme Court became salaried civil servants, with the title of Councillor of Justice (justitieråd). The earlier Lord High Steward or Justiciar (Riksdrots) became the new Minister of State for Justice (or Prime Minister for Justice) and the foremost member of the court in 1809, but when the modern government ministries were created in 1840, this minister of justice were separated from the court. In 1844 the requirement on equal numbers of noblemen and commoners in service as judges of the court was dropped.

In 1909, the Supreme Administrative Court (Regeringsrätten) and the Council on Legislation (Lagrådet) were created to assume certain tasks that had been handled by the Supreme Court. The Supreme Administrative Court assumed responsibility for ruling on administrative cases and the Legal Council received the responsibility for judicial review (strictly speaking legal preview). At the same time the monarch lost voting power in the court.

The right to appeal cases to the Supreme Court was limited for the first time in 1915. A special dispensation was required before trying a minor civil or criminal case. Dispensation was to be given when there was a ruling that could become a precedent, and in 1945 this requirement was extended to all cases.

In 1948, the legal procedure was supplemented with oral proceedings and to satisfy the need for additional space the Supreme Court was moved in 1949 from the Royal Palace to the Bonde Palace on Stadsholmen.

By the Instrument of Government of 1974 the Supreme Court discontinued the practice to award sentencing in the name of the Swedish monarch (Kungl Maj:t), as well as announcing them at the Royal Palace where they were adorned with the royal seal.

Current composition 
The current Councillors of Justice of the Supreme Court of Sweden, followed by year of appointment:

Anders Eka, Chairman (2013, Chairman since 2018)
Gudmund Toijer, Chairman of Chamber (2007, Chairman of Chamber since 2016)
Ann-Christine Lindeblad (2002)
Kerstin Calissendorff (2003)
Johnny Herre (2010)
Agneta Bäcklund (2010)
Svante O. Johansson (2011)
Dag Mattsson (2012)
Sten Andersson (2016)
Stefan Johansson (2016)
Petter Asp (2017)
Malin Bonthron (2017)
Eric M. Runesson (2018)
Stefan Reimer (2019)
Cecilia Renfors (2019)
Johan Danelius (2020)

Presidents of the Supreme Court of Sweden
1948–1952: Axel Afzelius
1952–1958: Ragnar Gyllenswärd
1958–1963: Carl Gustaf Hellquist
1963–1969: Nils Beckman
1969–1973: Sven Romanus
1973–1976: Sven Edling
1977–1979: Otto Petrén
1979–1984: Bengt Hult
1984–1986: Carl Holmberg
1986–1990: Olle Höglund
1990–1992: Sven Nyman
1992–1998: Anders Knutsson
1998–2002: Torkel Gregow
2002–2007: Bo Svensson
2007–2010: Johan Munck
2010–2016: Marianne Lundius
2016–2018: Stefan Lindskog
2018–present: Anders Eka

References

External links 

 

Courts in Sweden
Sweden
1789 establishments in Sweden
Courts and tribunals established in 1789